Henri Alavoine (6 March 1890 – 19 July 1916) was a French racing cyclist. He finished in last place in the 1913 Tour de France.

References

External links
 

1890 births
1916 deaths
French male cyclists
Cyclists from Paris
French military personnel killed in World War I